Spilarctia murzini is a moth in the family Erebidae. It was described by Vladimir Viktorovitch Dubatolov in 2005. It is found in Shaanxi, China.

References

Moths described in 2005
murzini